Chergui is the largest of the Kerkennah Islands off the north coast of Tunisia. The name means "Easterner" in Arabic. The main town is Remla. The island has an area of 110 km2. The second largest island of the group, Gharbi, means "Westerner" in Arabic. 
Islands of Tunisia
Mediterranean islands